De Freitas do Amaral may refer to:

 Diogo de Freitas do Amaral (1941–2019), a Portuguese politician and law professor
 Duarte de Freitas do Amaral (1909-1979), a Portuguese politician
 João de Freitas do Amaral (1948-1995), a Portuguese politician and journalist

See also 
 De Freitas (disambiguation)
 Do Amaral (disambiguation)